The Syracuse and South Bay Railway, also known as the Syracuse and South Bay Electric Railroad, incorporated on May 10, 1900, was an interurban rail that ran from Syracuse, New York, through Cicero to Lower South Bay on the south shore of Oneida Lake, a distance of .

References

Defunct railroads in Syracuse, New York
Defunct New York (state) railroads
Railway companies established in 1900
Railway companies disestablished in 1917
Interurban railways in New York (state)